A barbecue sandwich is a sandwich that is typically prepared with barbecued meats. Several types of meats are used to prepare barbecue sandwiches. Some varieties use cooked meats that are not barbecued, but include barbecue sauce. Many variations, including regional variations, exist, along with diverse types of cooking styles, preparations and ingredients.

Types
A plethora of meats and preparation styles for barbecue sandwiches exist. Meats may be sliced, chopped or pulled, and various types are used, such as pork, pulled pork, pork shoulder, beef, beef brisket, chicken, sausage, pork ribs and turkey. Some versions use slow-smoked meats. Barbecue sandwiches typically have barbecue sauce included in their preparation, either when the meat is cooked, as a sauce within a sandwich, or both. Some meats may be seasoned with a spice rub. Some barbecue sandwiches may use cooked meats that are not barbecued, but include a barbecue sauce. Coleslaw is sometimes served with barbecue sandwiches, either on the sandwich itself or as a side dish. Sometimes sautéed vegetables such as onion and garlic are also used. Some versions prepared with beef brisket include both lean and fatty portions from the cut of beef to enhance their flavor. Pre-packaged barbecue sandwiches are also manufactured.

Breads used in the preparation of barbecue sandwiches include white bread, hamburger buns, whole wheat bread and even rye bread. The bread can help to prevent the meat from drying and to retain its temperature.

Regional variations

Asia

East Asia
In East Asian cuisine, the northern Chinese rou jia mo and southern gua bao are common foods. Bánh mì sandwiches may contain BBQ chicken or marinated beef and roast pork.

United States

Illinois and Pennsylvania
In northeastern Pennsylvania, a barbecue sandwich generally refers to ground beef cooked in barbecue sauce, served on a hamburger bun, known in other parts of the country as a Sloppy Joe.

In northeastern Pennsylvania, the sandwich is often served at pizza places. see menu for Victory Pig Pizza, Wyoming, PA

Missouri

In Kansas City, Missouri, beef brisket barbecue sandwiches are common, and are served with sauce atop them or dry.

North Carolina

Chopped pork barbecue sandwiches with coleslaw served on the sandwich are common in North Carolina. The term "barbecue" in North Carolina commonly refers specifically to barbecued, chopped pork, whereas other barbecued foods are often referred to by their actual food name.

Tennessee

Chopped pork shoulder barbecue sandwiches served with coleslaw atop them are common in Memphis, Tennessee. For example, Leonard Heuberger, who in 1922 founded a barbecue restaurant in Memphis named Leonard's, has been reputed there as being the inventor of the "classic Memphis pork barbecue sandwich". This sandwich was prepared on a bun with chopped or pulled pork shoulder meat, a tomato-based sauce, and coleslaw. In the book Southern Food: At Home, on the Road, in History, it is stated that other restaurants "followed suit" regarding this sandwich style, and that "...the standard has not changed in more than 60 years." At the Memphis restaurant chain Tops, pork shoulder sandwiches are described in this book as a "mainstay" that have existed as such since 1952, when the first Tops restaurant opened.

Texas

East Texas
Barbecue in East Texas is often chopped beef or pork and is typically served on a bun. Griffin Smith, Jr. of the magazine Texas Monthly described East Texas barbecue as "...basically a sandwich product heavy on hot sauce."

See also

 Cha siu bao a Cantonese barbecue-pork-filled bun
 List of sandwiches
 Polish Boy Prepared on a bun with kielbasa and layers of french fries, barbecue or hot sauce and coleslaw
 Regional variations of barbecue
 Sloppy Joe A type of barbecue sandwich

References

Bibliography
 Garlough, Robert; Campbell, Angus (2011). Modern Garde Manger: A Global Perspective. Cengage Learning. 
 Lampe, Ray (2007). Dr. BBQ's Big-Time Barbecue Road Trip!. Macmillan. 
 Levine, Ed (2011) Serious Eats: A Comprehensive Guide to Making and Eating Delicious Food Wherever You Are. Random House Digital, Inc. 030772087X

Further reading
 Garner, Bob (2012). Bob Garner's Book of Barbecue: North Carolina's Favorite Food. John F. Blair (publisher). p. 102. 
 Witzel, Michael Karl (2008). Barbecue Road Trip: Recipes, Restaurants, & Pitmasters from America's Great Barbecue Regions. Voyageur Press. pages 48, 56, 91, 95, 103, 129, 161. 

Barbecue
Sandwiches